Hongjiacun is a residential community of Heshan Subdistrict in Heshan District, Yiyang, Hunan, China.

References

Communities of China
Heshan District, Yiyang